Lawrie MacMillan is a Scottish freelance bass guitarist and bass teacher from Rosyth in Fife, Scotland.

Lawrie MacMillan is best known for his work with the chart-topping group Stiltskin, fronted by the vocalist Ray Wilson, who in the late 1990s also fronted the band Genesis, replacing Phil Collins. As Ray Wilson's bassist, he is also involved in the Genesis Classic touring show.

A co-founder of the long-running Fife-based party band Cut the Cake, he has also performed, toured and recorded with artists and bands including Stuart Adamson, The Raphaels, Amy Duncan, The Iron Horse (Scottish band) and was featured as Glasgow Royal Concert Hall's house bass player on the BBC Two series, Ealtainn and the BBC Alba series Ceol Country.

He endorses MarkBass amplification, Nordstrand pickups, Elixir Strings and plays Sadowsky bass guitars, as well as owning a versatile collection of horrendous bass guitars.

References

External links
Official website

Scottish bass guitarists
Living people
Year of birth missing (living people)
People from Rosyth